Ermo is a Chinese comedy/drama film, released in 1994 and directed by Zhou Xiaowen. It is essentially a satire on Western consumerism and its influence on Chinese culture.

It was adapted from a novella written by Xu Baoqi. Tan Ye and Yun Zhu, authors of Historical Dictionary of Chinese Cinema, wrote that Ermo "observes the new trends of capitalism and consumerism in rural China at the beginning of the reform era".

Development
Zhou Xiaowen, the director, said that "In China, money was once a synonym for filth. Now money has become a god. But will [this god] be able to satisfy his people?"

Plot
Ermo is a hardworking village woman in the northern province of Hebei, who makes noodles to feed her husband and child. When her neighbor buys a brand new television, she is consumed by dreams of owning one herself. Desperate to own the largest television in the village, she becomes obsessive in her desire to earn money, eventually leaving the village to work in town. Her efforts to earn enough money damages her health and her relationship with her family.

The film demonstrates new trends and changes the Chinese society during the reform era and the different attitudes between those who joined the capitalist race and those who remained behind. Ermo becomes a wise merchant (even if she only sells dry noodles) and a consumer full of aspirations, while her elder husband still drinks his Chinese medicine and sees himself as the former head of village, a role which was meaningful during the Mao era. While Ermo is becoming more and more attracted to Xiazi, her business-oriented neighbor, and the lifestyle he represents, her husband remains impotent, both physically and metaphorically. As the film progresses it is evident that the competent capitalist-minded characters also do not find satisfaction, though it is also clear that those who don't join the race are completely irrelevant in the modern society.

Filming
Public Secrets, Public Spaces: Cinema and Civility in China, wrote that the narrative's space in Ermo has a "sense of desperation and inevitability" because the film's narrative was "filmed in a series of claustrophobic places".

Purpose
Felix Thompson, the author of "Journeying in the Third World", wrote that the film questions the concept of progress by juxtaposing individualism and collectivism.

The main thematical element of Ermo is consumer behavior.

Characters
 Ermo (二嫫 Èrmó) - The main character, portrayed by Ai Liya (艾丽娅)
 Jerome Silbergeld, author of China Into Film: Frames of Reference in Contemporary Chinese Cinema, wrote that "Ermo's unwitting desire is for freedom from poverty and rural isolation but her pursuit of modernity in a box, earned with her feet and her blood, enslaves her body and soul." Tony Rayns, author of "Review of Ermo", wrote that the film never "laughs at [Ermo's] expense" even though the naivety of Ermo is the basis of a lot of the film's humor.
 Ermo's husband or Village Chief (村长 Cūnzhǎng) - A former village chief, Ermo's husband moves the items bought with Ermo's money into another room of the house and advocates for the traditional Communist social values. Ultimately he cannot prevent Western values and the television from coming into his household. Ge Zhijun portrays him.
 Jerome Silbergeld, author of China Into Film: Frames of Reference in Contemporary Chinese Cinema, wrote that the husband, contrasts with Ermo, who is sexually charged and young. Silbergeld wrote that he is "a signature for the displacement of the Maoist old guard in China's pursuit of economic 'progress' and its growing social inequalities."
 Blindman / Xiazi (瞎子 Xiāzi) - Ermo's neighbor and love interest. His name literally means "a blind person". Liu Peiqi portrays him.
 Blindman's wife - She becomes jealous of Ermo because she has a daughter and not a son. Once she receives a television she tries to use that against Ermo. She invites Tiger to watch TV with her family and mentions the idea that Xiu and Tiger will marry someday. This causes Ermo to try to buy her own TV to outdo Blindman's wife. Yigang Pan, author of Greater China in the Global Market, Volume 14, wrote that the wife's TV puts the wife "on equal footing" against Ermo. She is portrayed by Zhang Haiyan.
 Tiger / Huzi (虎子 Huzǐ) is Ermo's son. Yan Zhenguo portrays him.
 Xiu / Xiuer (秀儿 Xiùér) - The daughter of Blindman and his wife and playmate of Tiger. She is younger than Tiger. She is portrayed by Yang Xiao.

Reception
During the 1994 Locarno International Film Festival the film won the Swissair/Crossair Special Prize and the Prize of the Ecumenical Jury.

Year-end lists 
 Honorable mention –  Glenn Lovell, San Jose Mercury News

DVD release
The film has yet to be released onto DVD in the United States. It has, however, been released on VHS in the U.S.

References
 Donald, Stephanie. Public Secrets, Public Spaces: Cinema and Civility in China. Rowman & Littlefield, 2000. , 9780847698776.
 Pan, Yigang. Greater China in the Global Market, Volume 14 (Volume 14, Issues 1-2 of Journal of global marketing, ISSN 0891-1762; The Journal of global marketing monographic "Separates"). Psychology Press, 2000. , 9780789011886.
 Silbergeld, Jerome. China Into Film: Frames of Reference in Contemporary Chinese Cinema. Reaktion Books, 1999. , 9781861890504.
 Thompson, Felix. "Journeying in the Third World". in: Crouch, David, Rhona Jackson, and Felix Thompson (editors). The Media and the Tourist Imagination: Converging Cultures (Contemporary Geographies of Leisure, Tourism and Mobility). Routledge, June 15, 2005. , 9780203139295.
 Ye, Tan and Yun Zhu. Historical Dictionary of Chinese Cinema. Rowman & Littlefield, 2012. , 9780810867796. - There is a chapter on "Ermo".

Notes

Further reading
 Ciecko, Anne T. and Sheldon Lu. "Televisuality, Capital, and the Global Village: ERMO (Zhou Xiaowen, 1994)." Jump Cut 41 (1998). Rpt. in Lu, ed., China, Transnational Visuality, Global Postmodernity. Stanford: Stanford UP, 2002. 122–38.
 Fu, Ping. "Ermo: (Tele)Visualizing Urban/Rural Transformation." In Chris Berry, ed., Chinese Films in Focus: 25 New Takes. London: BFI Publishing, 2003, 73–80. Rpt. in Chris Berry, ed., Chinese Films in Focus II. Basingstoke: BFI/Palgrave, 2008, 98-105.  
 Gould, Stephen J. and Nancy Y. C. Wong. "The Intertextual Construction of Emerging Consumer Culture in China as Observed in the Movie Ermo: A Postmodern, Sinicization Reading." Journal of Global Marketing 14 (2000): 151–67. 
 Li, David Leiwei. "'What Will Become of Us if We Don't Stop?' Ermo's China and the End of Globalization." Comparative Literature 53, 4 (2001): 442–61. 
 Notar, Beth. "Blood Money: Women's Desire and Consumption in Ermo." Asian Cinema 12, 2 (Fall/Winter 2001): 131–53. 
 Rayns, Tony. "Review of Ermo." Sight and Sound. 1995. p. 47-48.
 Tang, Xiaobing. "Rural Women and Social Change in New China Cinema: From Li Shuangshuang to Ermo." positions 11.3 (Winter 2003): 647–74.

External links

 Ermo (二嫫) - Women’s Independence, Men’s Impotence, an article from Thinking Chinese, August 2010.

1994 films
1994 comedy-drama films
1990s Mandarin-language films
Films set in Hebei
Adultery in films
Films directed by Zhou Xiaowen
Chinese comedy-drama films
Films shot in Zhangjiakou